The Astrud Gilberto Album (with Antonio Carlos Jobim) is the debut studio album by Astrud Gilberto. With Antonio Carlos Jobim on guitar and the arrangements by Marty Paich, it was released via Verve Records in 1965. It peaked at number 41 on the Billboard 200 chart. In 2017, NPR placed it at number 73 on the "150 Greatest Albums Made by Women" list.

Track listing

Personnel
 Astrud Gilberto – vocals
 Antônio Carlos Jobim – guitar, vocals (on track 2)
 Joe Mondragon – double bass
 Bud Shank – alto saxophone, flute
 João Donato – piano
 Stu Williamson – trumpet
 Milt Bernhart – trombone
 Guildhall String Ensemble – ensemble

Charts

References

External links
 

1965 debut albums
Astrud Gilberto albums
Verve Records albums
Albums produced by Creed Taylor
Albums arranged by Marty Paich
Portuguese-language albums